Amman Sports Club  was a Jordanian football club from Amman.

History
Amman Sports Club is one of the oldest clubs in Jordanian football, which was established in 1976. The club won their only trophy in the 1984 Jordan League, then they participated in the 1985–86 Asian Club Championship. They were relegated at the end of the 1988 Jordan League and did not return to the highest level since. However, the club was later folded.

Honours
Jordan Premier League:
 Champions (1) : 1984
Jordan FA Shield:
 Champions (2) : 1984, 1985

References

 

1976 establishments in Jordan
Association football clubs established in 1976
Defunct football clubs in Jordan
Sport in Amman